Volodymyr Hennadiyovych Chesnakov (born 12 February 1988) is a Ukrainian professional footballer who plays as a midfielder for Vorskla Poltava in the Ukrainian Premier League.

Career statistics

Club

References

External links
 
 
 Profile on Football Squads

1988 births
Living people
People from Hlobyne
Ukrainian footballers
FC Vorskla Poltava players
Ukrainian Premier League players
Ukraine under-21 international footballers
Association football defenders
Sportspeople from Poltava Oblast